Kurzweil Education (formerly Kurzweil Educational Systems) is an American-based company that provides educational technology.

Kurzweil Education provides literacy solutions, tools and training for those with learning differences and challenges, or people with  blindness or partially sighted.

Founded in 1996, the company has pioneered the development of computerized assistive technology.  Its headquarters are in Dallas, Texas.

The company supplies two principal software products to its customers—Kurzweil 1000 and Kurzweil 3000.  Kurzweil 1000 is a software which enables a visually impaired user to gain access to both web-based, digital or scanned print materials through its OCR and text to speech features; Kurzweil 1000 software provides easy access to most printed forms and presents them with the fields, labels, boxes, and text areas in the appropriate reading order to enable forms completion via the computer.

Kurzweil 3000 is an educational technology, or assistive technology, which provides a reading, writing and study platform aimed at people with learning disabilities or other disabilities that make reading or writing difficult. Kurzweil 3000 is used to support those with dyslexia, dysgraphia, English language learners in school, higher education, at home and in the workplace.  Kurzweil 3000 can read aloud web-based, digital or scanned print material, convert web-based, digital or scanned print materials into mp3 to provide audible files to listen to on the go or through its firefly web app can be read on an iPad.

Though the company was formed in 1996, its text to speech software is actually something that dates back to the 1970s, when Raymond Kurzweil developed his first Kurzweil Reading Machine, a device which could scan and speak text.

In 2005, Kurzweil Educational Systems was acquired by Cambium Learning Technologies.  Cambium owns a number of other education related companies.

See also 

 K-NFB Reader
 Assistive Technology

References

External links 
Official website

Blindness equipment
Education companies established in 1996
Computer accessibility
Software companies based in Massachusetts
Software companies of the United States